O Parrulo Fútbol Sala is a futsal club based in Ferrol, city of Spain.

Its pavilion is Pavillón A Malata with capacity of 6,000 seaters.

The main sponsor is Estrella Galicia.

The team played 5 seasons in División de Honor. (from 1998/99 to 2002/03).

Season to season

8 seasons in Primera División
9 seasons in Segunda División
11 seasons in Segunda División B
3 seasons in Tercera División

Current squad

External links
official website

Futsal clubs in Galicia (Spain)
Futsal clubs established in 1981
1981 establishments in Spain
Ferrol, Spain